Bartholomae can refer to:

 Bartholomä, a municipality in the German state of Baden-Württemberg
 Christian Bartholomae, a German Indo-Europeanist
 Bartholomae's law